Alexander Charles, Duke of Anhalt-Bernburg (2 March 1805 – 19 August 1863) was a German prince of the House of Ascania. From 1834 until 1863 he was the last duke of the Duchy of Anhalt-Bernburg.

Life

Early life
Alexander Charles was born at Ballenstedt on 2 March 1805 as the second (but eldest and only surviving) son of Alexius Frederick Christian, Duke of Anhalt-Bernburg, by his first wife Maria Fredericka, daughter of William I, Elector of Hesse.

Succession
After the death of his father in 1834, Alexander Karl succeeded him in Anhalt-Bernburg.

Marriage
In Gottorp on 30 October 1834 Alexander Karl married Princess Friederike of Schleswig-Holstein-Sonderburg-Glücksburg, daughter of Frederick William, Duke of Schleswig-Holstein-Sonderburg-Glücksburg and his wife Princess Louise Caroline of Hesse-Kassel; she was also a sister of the later King Christian IX of Denmark. The union was childless.

Reign
By November 1855 the Duke was confined to Schloss Hoym due to a progressive mental illness (some sources state that he had schizophrenia). There, Alexander Karl spend the rest of his life under medical care in the company of his chamberlain, the painter Wilhelm von Kügelgen.

Due to his incapacity, his wife Friederike acted as regent.

Death
Alexander Charles died at Hoym on 19 August 1863. As the marriage produced no issue, with him, the line of Anhalt-Bernburg became extinct. The Duchy of Anhalt-Bernburg was inherited by his kinsman Leopold IV, Duke of Anhalt-Dessau-Köthen who merged the duchy with his own to form a united Duchy of Anhalt.

Ancestry

1805 births
1863 deaths
People from Ballenstedt
Rulers of Anhalt
House of Ascania
German princes
Burials at Schlosskirche St. Aegidien (Bernburg)